José Moës (19 July 1923 – 20 February 2016) was a Belgian footballer. He played in six matches for the Belgium national football team from 1951 to 1954.

References

External links
 

1923 births
2016 deaths
Belgian footballers
Belgium international footballers
Place of birth missing
Association footballers not categorized by position